Danniel Danniel (1950-May 4, 2017) was an Israeli film director, screenwriter and film editor. He lived in the Netherlands since 1980.
He died in the morning of 4 May 2017 in Amsterdam.
 
He graduated from the Netherlands Film and Television Academy (NFTVA) in 1981. His 1987 short film Ei won the Best International Fantasy Film Award.

He directed the 2003 documentary on the Palestinian conflict Arna's Children.

Filmography

As director
Meetings (1981)
The Way to Paris (1982)
Station (1985)
Ei (1987). Won International Fantasy Film Award for best short film at the Fantasporto film festival (1989)
Viaduc (1991)
Tralievader (1995) (TV)
Mykosch (1995)
Winter '89 (1998)
"Russen" (2000) TV Series (unknown episodes)
De zaak Braun (2000) Short Television Drama
Arna's Children (2003) Won FIPRESCI Prize at the Hot Docs Canadian International Documentary Festival (2004) and the Jury Award (shared with Juliano Mer-Khamis for Best Documentary Feature at the Tribeca Film Festival (2004)
Sporen (2014) Won Jean Vigo Prize for Best Director, shared with Diego Gutiérrez, at the International Documentary Film Festival of Navarra Punto de Vista (2015)
While Looking for the Devil (2016) In collaboration with Diego Gutiérrez

Film editor
Krokodillen in Amsterdam (Crocodiles in Amsterdam) (1990)
De Domeinen Ditvoorst (1992)
Sarajevo Film Festival (Documentary short) (1993)
Metaal en melancholie (1994)
Jalan raya pos (1996)
Mijn vader maakt foto's (1997)
The Making of a New Empire (Documentary) (1999) 
Tussenland (TV)(2002) 
Golestan (Documentary) (2004)
Forever (2006)
De grote tovenaar (Documentary) 2006 
Talking Guitars (Documentary) 2007
Izaline Calister: Lady Sings the Tambú (Documentary) 2007 
De werkelijkheid van Jan Vrijman (TV Movie documentary) 2007
After the Rape (Documentary) 2008
El olvido (Documentary) (2008)
Later We Care (Documentary) 2009 
900 Dagen (Documentary) 2011 
End and Beginning: Meeting Wislawa Szymborska (Documentary) 2011
Daughters of Malakeh (Documentary) 2011
Soldier on the Roof (2012)
The House that Leo Built (Documentary) (post-production) (2012)
De Kolonisten van Hebron (Documentary) (2012)
Futures Past (Documentary) (2012/II)
Parts of a Family (Documentary) (2012)
UTAC - Tussen Kaapverdië en Rotterdam (Documentary) (2012)
Sporen (Documentary) (2014) 
Floating Bodies (Documentary) (2014)
Om de wereld in 50 concerten (Documentary)(2014)
Little Angels (Documentary) (2015)
Daan's Inheritance (Documentary) (2016)
The Company you Keep (Documentary) (2017)

References

External links

1950 births
2017 deaths
Dutch Jews
Dutch film directors
Dutch film editors
Dutch screenwriters
Dutch male screenwriters
Israeli Jews
Israeli film directors
Israeli film editors
Israeli male screenwriters
Dutch people of Israeli descent
People from Haifa